Shaun Thomas Sabol (born July 13, 1966) is an American former professional ice hockey defenseman who played in the National Hockey League (NHL) with the Philadelphia Flyers during the  season..

Career statistics

External links
 

1966 births
Living people
American men's ice hockey defensemen
Binghamton Rangers players
Hershey Bears players
Philadelphia Flyers draft picks
Philadelphia Flyers players
St. Paul Vulcans players
Wisconsin Badgers men's ice hockey players
Ice hockey people from Minneapolis